Ritva is a Finnish and Faroese female given name.

Origin and meaning 
 Finnish „ritva“ = a slender, hanging branch of a birch or a willow

Name day 
 May 27

People 
 Ritva Hannele Lauri (born 1952), Finnish actress
 Ritva Lemettinen-Melender (born 1960), Finnish long-distance runner

Feminine given names
Finnish feminine given names